Begelman is a surname. Notable people with the surname include:

David Begelman (1921–1995), American film producer, film executive, and talent agent
Igor Begelman, clarinetist